Saperda facetula is a species of beetle in the family Cerambycidae. It was described by Holzschuh in 1999. It is known from Vietnam.

References

facetula
Beetles described in 1999